Chopstick Bridge is the second album by Avoid One Thing.

The album was released as an Enhanced CD with an 18-minute documentary film by Len Gittleman. The film includes footage of Joe Gittleman at a Dunkin' Donuts drive-thru, Gittleman and Amy Griffin jamming, John Lynch's Kiss memorabilia, Griffin riding her bicycle, and the band practicing and performing.

Track listing
All songs by Joe Gittleman unless noted.
"Armbands And Braids" – 2:45
"Chopstick Bridge" – 2:56
"All That You've Heard" (Amy Griffin) – 3:43
"A Lot Like This" – 2:46
"Judy" (Gittleman/Griffin) – 3:30
"About You" – 3:16
"Next Stop Is The Last Stop" (Gittleman/Griffin) – 2:35
"Gone And Forgotten" – 3:59
"Streetlight" – 3:17
"Fillmore East" – 2:54
"The Airplane" (Griffin) – 0:30
"Renegade" – 3:30
"Capital Letters" (Griffin) – 3:22
"Watching Us Anyway" (Gittleman/Griffin) – 4:56

Personnel
Paul Q. Kolderie - Producer, Engineer
Adam Taylor - Assistant Engineer
Matt Beaudoin - Additional Recording
Jeff Lipton - Mastering
Susan Butler - Photography
Maura Lynch - Photography
Joe Gittleman - Vocals, Bass
Amy Griffin - Vocals, Guitar
John Lynch - Drums

2004 albums
Avoid One Thing albums
SideOneDummy Records albums
Albums produced by Paul Q. Kolderie